Alexandros Alexandrakis (Athens, 1913 – Athens, 1968) was a Greek painter, who became widely known from his particularly dynamic depictions of the Greco-Italian War of 1940.

Alexandrakis showed an early talent for design and painting. In the age of 17, he exhibited 23 works in the group show organised by HAN. He then studied painting in Athens School of Fine Arts under the supervision of masters Spyridonas Vikatos and Umbertos Argyros. Later, he attended classes in engraving by the master Giannis Kefallinos. He graduated from the school in 1937, and went on to participate in various exhibitions.

In World War II, which in Greece is called the Greco-Italian War, Alexandrakis and his five brothers were called to military duty to the Greek-Albanian borders. He found himself in the high mountainous area of 'Pindos' where he served as corporal. Inspired by his situation, he sketched and painted his memories in a series of artworks that made him popular in Greece in the post-war years. A collection of them was published in 1968 with the title 'Thus we fought' (original in Greek: Έτσι πολεμούσαμε).

He also spent considerable time with Art nude and in 1958 Alexandrakis was the illustrator of public junior school book for the fifth grade. He became known outside Greece when he started collaborating with institutions such as the Guggenheim Museum and USA Senator Library. He died at the age of 55.

In 1980, the National Gallery of Greece honoured Alexandrakis with a Retrospection Exhibition. Gallery K in London presented works by him in 1998 and 2005.

Bibliography
 Α. Αλεξανδράκης, Έτσι πολεμούσαμε 1940-41, εκδ. Πάπυρος, Αθήνα 1968. (Publication in 4 languages  Greek, English, French και German.)
 A. Alexandrakis, The War We Fought, 1940-41, The Hellenic Centre, London 1995, .

External links
«The Paintings of A.Alexandrakis for the 1940 War» — Some known paintings by Alexandrakis
Alexandrakis, Alexandros (1913-1968) — From gallery 'K', London, 2005 (στα αγγλικά).

1968 deaths
1913 births
20th-century Greek painters
Artists from Athens